Remontada may refer to:

 FC Barcelona 6–1 Paris Saint-Germain FC, association football match known as La Remontada
 Remontada, Spanish word for comeback, often associated with association football
 Remontada, rap song by Sofiane